Thuranna Jail is a 1982 Indian Malayalam film, directed by J. Sasikumar. The film stars Jayabharathi, Sathaar, Sukumaran and M. G. Soman in the lead roles. The film has musical score by Johnson. The film was a remake of the Hindi film Do Aankhen Barah Haath.

Cast
Jayabharathi as Thulasi
Sathaar as James
Sukumaran as Gopi
M. G. Soman as Rajan
Prathapachandran as Habeeb
Kunchan as Thankappan
KPAC Azeez as Chachappan
Alummoodan as Dasappan
KPAC Sunny as Kuttan Pilla
Jagannatha Varma as Venukuttan
C. I. Paul as Vaasu
Reena as Mercy
Meena as Kunjikutty

Soundtrack
The music was composed by Johnson and the lyrics were written by Poovachal Khader and P. Bhaskaran.

References

External links
 

1982 films
1980s Malayalam-language films
Malayalam remakes of Hindi films
Films directed by J. Sasikumar